KF Vlora is an Albanian football club based in the southern city of Vlorë. They are currently not playing in any senior football league.

References

Vlora
2006 establishments in Albania
Sport in Vlorë
Association football clubs established in 2006
Albanian Third Division clubs
Kategoria e Dytë clubs